Splendor is a 1935 American drama film starring Miriam Hopkins and Joel McCrea, produced by Samuel Goldwyn, and distributed by United Artists.

It is the third film made by Hopkins and McCrea after The Richest Girl in the World and Barbary Coast. The two later starred  in These Three and Woman Chases Man.

Cast
Miriam Hopkins as Phyllis Manning Lorrimore
Joel McCrea as Brighton Lorrimore
Paul Cavanagh as Martin Deering
Helen Westley as Mrs. Emmeline Lorrimore
Billie Burke as Clarissa
David Niven as Clancey Lorrimore
Katharine Alexander as Martha Lorrimore
Ruth Weston as Edith Gilbert
Arthur Treacher as Major Ballinger

External links

1935 films
1935 drama films
American drama films
American black-and-white films
Films directed by Elliott Nugent
Samuel Goldwyn Productions films
1930s English-language films
1930s American films